The 2009–10 Umaglesi Liga was the 21st season of top-tier football in Georgia. It began on August 1, 2009, and ended on May 20, 2010. FC Olimpi Rustavi won the championship.

Changes from 2008–09

Structural changes
League size was reduced from 11 to 10 teams prior to this season.

Promotion and relegation
Borjomi were relegated to Pirveli Liga at the end of the season after finishing in 11th and last place. Other teams which will not participate in this year's championship are Mglebi and Meshketi, both due to unknown reasons. This means that originally relegated teams Gagra and Spartaki Tskhinvali will stay another season in Umaglesi Liga.

Promoted to Georgia's top football division were Pirveli Liga 2008–09 Western group champions Samtredia and runners-up Baia. Western group champions Ameri were not promoted due to unknown reasons.

Team overview
FC Gagra and Spartaki Tskhinvali play their home matches in Tbilisi due to various inner-Georgian conflicts.

League table

Results
The ten teams will play each other four times in this league for a total of 36 matches per team. In the first half of the season each team played every other team twice (home and away) and then do the same in the second half of the season.

First half of season

Second half of season

Top goalscorers
Including matches played in December 2009

See also
 2009–10 Pirveli Liga
 2009–10 Georgian Cup

References

External links
 Georgian Football Federation 
 Georgian Professional Football League 

Erovnuli Liga seasons
1
Georgia